The Misfits is a 1961 American neo-Western film written by Arthur Miller, directed by John Huston, and starring Clark Gable, Marilyn Monroe, and Montgomery Clift. The supporting cast includes Thelma Ritter and Eli Wallach. Adapted by Miller from his own short story of the same name published in Esquire in October 1957, The Misfits was the last completed film for both Clark Gable and Marilyn Monroe. For Gable, the film was posthumously released, Marilyn Monroe died in August 1962, and Montgomery Clift died in July 1966. The plot centers on Roslyn Tabor (Monroe), a newly divorced woman from Reno, and her relationships with friendly landlady Isabelle Steers (Thelma Ritter), an old-school cowboy Gaylord Langland (Gable), his tow truck-driving and plane-flying best friend (Wallach), and their rodeo-riding, bronc-busting friend (Clift).

The Misfits was a commercial failure at the time of its initial release, but received critical acclaim for its script and performances. Its reputation has shifted over the following years, and many critics now consider the film to be a masterpiece and one of the best films of the 1960s.

Plot
In Reno, Nevada, 30-year-old Roslyn Tabor files for a quickie six-week residency divorce from her inattentive husband, Raymond. Afterward, Roslyn's landlady Isabelle takes her to a cocktail lounge at Harrah's for drinks. At Harrah's they meet an aging cowboy named Gaylord Langland, and his tow truck driver best friend, Guido. The friendly Guido tells Roslyn and Isabelle about his unfinished house in the country by Pyramid Lake. Later that day, the group drives out to the unfinished house Guido has built for his late wife. After drinking and dancing, Roslyn has had too much to drink, so Gaylord drives her home to Reno.

Eventually, Roslyn and Gaylord move into Guido's half-finished house and work on finishing it. One day, Gaylord tells Roslyn how he wishes he were more of a father to his children, whom he has not seen for years. Later, he discovers rabbits have been eating the lettuce in the garden they have planted. Gay wants to kill the rabbits with his shotgun, an idea that Roslyn opposes.

When Guido and Isabelle show up, Guido suggests that they round up wild mustangs to sell. They go to a local rodeo to hire a third man. They run into Perce Howland, a cowboy friend of Gaylord's, who wants to compete in the rodeo. Gaylord offers to pay the broke Perce's $10 entry fee if he will help round up mustangs the next day.

At the rodeo, Roslyn becomes somewhat upset when Guido tells her how the horses are made to buck with an irritating flank strap. Perce is thrown by a bucking horse, and Roslyn begs him to go to a hospital, and offers him money if he won't ride again, but he insists on riding a bull he had already signed up and paid to ride. He gets thrown again, sustaining a head injury.

Later, he passes out in a back alley. When he regains consciousness, he sees Roslyn crying over him. He says that he never had anyone cry for him before and that he wished he had a friend to talk to. He tells her how his mother changed after his father died, giving his stepfather the ranch Perce's father wanted to leave to Perce. A drunken Gaylord then fetches Roslyn, telling her that he wants her to meet his kids, claiming he unexpectedly ran into them. When Gaylord discovers his children have already left the bar, he causes a public scene. It is unclear where the children were actually there.

During the drive home, a drunken Guido recalls his wartime service as a bombardier, asks if Roslyn has left Gaylord and offers to take his place. Back at Guido's house, Guido attempts to finish the patio he started. Later, Gaylord asks Roslyn if a woman like her would ever want to have a child with him. She avoids the issue.

The next day, Gaylord, Guido and Perce go after the mustangs, with Roslyn reluctantly tagging along. Guido uses his biplane to flush out the horses from the mountains, and it turns out that there are only five of them, a stallion and four mares. Perce says that it is barely worth it to pursue so few horses.

Roslyn becomes upset when she learns that they will be slaughtered for dog food. Gaylord tells Roslyn that he has always caught mustangs and that they used to be in immense herds, and that they made fine riding horses. But over time, he says, "they changed it all around" and now what was good is considered bad. He says that he catches the mustangs to preserve his freedom and prevent him from having to take a job for wages.

After they catch the mustangs, Roslyn begs Gaylord to release the horses. He considers it, but when she offers to pay him $200, it angers him. Guido tells Roslyn that he would release them if she would leave Gaylord for him. She rebuffs him. Perce asks her if she wants him to set the horses free, but she declines because she thinks it would only start a fight. Perce frees the stallion anyway. After Gaylord chases down and subdues it by himself, he lets it go and says he just did not want anybody making up his mind for him. He pledges never to catch mustangs again, and says that what used to be good is now "smeared in blood," and that roping mustangs is now like "roping a dream." He says he has to "find another way to be alive, if there is one."

As they are driving away in Gaylord's truck, Roslyn tells Gaylord that she will leave the next day. He stops the truck to pick up his dog and watches her joyfully untethering it. They snuggle together as he drives home.

Cast

Production

The making of The Misfits was troublesome on several accounts, not the least of which was the sometimes 100 °F (38 °C) heat of the northern Nevada desert and the breakdown of Monroe's marriage to writer Arthur Miller. Miller revised the script throughout the shoot as the concepts of the film developed.

Meanwhile, with her marriage to Arthur Miller troubled, Marilyn Monroe was drinking too much after work and using prescription drugs. According to Huston in a 1981 retrospective interview, he felt "absolutely certain that she was doomed," a conclusion he reached while working on the film: "There was evidence right before me almost every day. She was incapable of rescuing herself or of being rescued by anyone else. And it sometimes affected her work. We had to stop the picture while she went to a hospital for two weeks." Huston shut down production in August 1960 when Monroe went to a hospital for relaxation and depression treatment. Some close-ups after her hospital discharge were shot using limited soft focus. Monroe was nearly always an hour late to the set, sometimes not showing up at all. Monroe spent her nights learning newly written lines with her drama coach Paula Strasberg. Monroe's confidant and masseur, Ralph Roberts, was cast as an ambulance attendant in the film's rodeo scene. The other actors and Huston did not complain to Monroe about her lateness—they knew they needed her to finish the movie. Gable reminisced with The Making of the Misfits author James Goode saying, "Long ago, if an actor was late, they were fired."

Director John Huston said after Gable's death he would never have allowed Gable to do the more dangerous mustang stunts.

Veteran B-movie Western actor Rex Bell, who had been married to Clara Bow, made his final film appearance in a brief cameo as an amusing elderly cowboy. Bell was lieutenant governor of Nevada at the time.

Thomas B. Allen was assigned to create drawings of The Misfits as the film was made. Magnum Photos had numerous staff photographers, including Ernst Haas, Inge Morath, and Eve Arnold assigned to document the making of The Misfits. Inge Morath later married Arthur Miller, Monroe's former husband, a year after the film was released.

During production, the cast's principals stayed at the now imploded Mapes Hotel in Reno. Film locations included the Washoe County Court House on Virginia Street, and Quail Canyon, near Pyramid Lake. The bar scene wherein Monroe plays paddle ball and the rodeo scenes were filmed in Dayton, Nevada, east of Carson City. For the final three weeks of shooting, Miller and Monroe moved to the nearby Holiday Hotel and Casino, now the Renaissance Hotel, on Center Street in Reno. The Renaissance Hotel no longer has a casino. The climax of the film takes place during wrangling scenes on a Nevada dry lake twelve miles east of Dayton, near Stagecoach. The area today is known as "Misfits Flat".

Filming was completed on November 4, 1960, twelve days before Clark Gable's death, and The Misfits was released on February 1, 1961, on what would have been Gable's 60th birthday.

Reception

Box office
The Misfits failed to meet expectations at the box office and has been historically referred to as a "box office disaster" of its day. Despite being shot in black and white, the final cost was about $4 million, which was the estimated budget. The film grossed $4,100,000 in its initial USA release.

Critical reception

Despite on-set difficulties, Gable, Monroe, Clift and Wallach delivered performances that modern critics consider superb. Many critics regard Gable's performance as his finest, and Gable, after seeing the rough cuts, agreed. Monroe received the 1961 Golden Globe Award as "World Film Favorite" in March 1962, five months before her death. Huston was nominated for the Directors Guild of America Award for Outstanding Directing – Feature Film. In 2005, the film was nominated by the American Film Institute in the AFI's 100 Years of Film Scores list.

On the review aggregation website Rotten Tomatoes, 97% of 31 critics have given The Misfits a positive review, with an average rating of 8.1/10. In later years, the film came to be described as a cult classic. The Guardian wrote that the film is one of the films that "marked a turning point in the cinema, influencing directors, actors, and audiences."

Aftermath
Gable suffered a heart attack two days after filming ended and died ten days later on November 16, 1960. Monroe and Clift attended the premiere in New York in February 1961, while Arthur Miller attended with his two children. Monroe later said that she hated the film and her performance in it. Within a year and a half, she was dead of an apparent drug overdose. The Misfits was the last completed film for both Monroe and Gable, her childhood screen idol. In her last interview, Monroe, who never knew her father, said she often fantasized that Gable was her father. Montgomery Clift died five years later, and made only three more movies.

The documentary The Legend of Marilyn Monroe (1966) includes footage shot while The Misfits was being made. Miller's autobiography Timebends (1987) described the making of the film. The 2001 PBS documentary Making The Misfits did the same. Primary sources such as The Making of the Misfits by James Goode, Conversations with Marilyn by W.J. Weatherby, and Miller's account, particularly his assertion that The Misfits script was a "valentine" for Monroe, inspired the docu-drama play Misfits by Alex Finlayson, which was commissioned by director Greg Hersov. Misfits premiered at the Royal Exchange Theatre, Manchester, UK in 1996, directed by Hersov and starring Lisa Eichhorn as Marilyn Monroe.

Arthur Miller's last play Finishing the Picture (2004), although fiction, was based on the events involved in the making of The Misfits.

Discovered scene
In August 2018, an un-released nude scene where Marilyn Monroe exposes herself while making love with Clark Gable's character, and which was thought to have been lost, was discovered.

Home media
The Misfits was released to DVD by MGM Home Entertainment on May 8, 2012 as a Region 1 widescreen DVD and on May 10, 2011 on Blu-ray.

See also
 List of American films of 1961

References

Bibliography 
  First published as The Story of The Misfits (Bobbs-Merrill, 1963)

External links

 
 
 
 
 
 Site on the production of The Misfits

1961 films
1960s English-language films
1961 Western (genre) films
American Western (genre) films
1961 romantic drama films
American romantic drama films
American black-and-white films
Films based on short fiction
Films directed by John Huston
Films scored by Alex North
Films set in Nevada
Films set in Reno, Nevada
Films shot in Nevada
Films with screenplays by Arthur Miller
Neo-Western films
United Artists films
1960s American films